Horseneck and Horse's Neck may refer to:
Horseneck Tract
Horseneck, Pleasants County, West Virginia
Horseneck Beach State Reservation
A former name for the Greenwich Avenue Historic District
Horse's Neck, an American cocktail
Horse's Neck (book), a collection of short stories by Pete Townshend